German submarine U-402 was a Type VIIC U-boat built for Nazi Germany's Kriegsmarine for service during World War II.

She was laid down at the Danziger Werft in the city of the same name on 22 April 1940 as yard number 103, launched on 28 December 1940 and was commissioned on 21 May 1941, with Kapitänleutnant Siegfried Freiherr von Forstner in command.

The boat commenced her career with the 3rd U-boat Flotilla on 21 May 1941 carrying-out training before moving on to operations on 1 October 1941. U-402 carried out eight combat patrols, sinking 14 merchantmen and one auxiliary warship for a total of  during the Second World War. She also damaged three other ships. The submarine was a member of twelve wolfpacks.

For his numerous successes, von Forstner received the Knight's Cross.

Design
German Type VIIC submarines were preceded by the shorter Type VIIB submarines. U-402 had a displacement of  when at the surface and  while submerged. She had two shafts and two  propellers.

U-402 was fitted with five  torpedo tubes (four fitted at the bow and one at the stern), fourteen torpedoes, one  SK C/35 naval gun, 220 rounds, and a  C/30 anti-aircraft gun. The boat had a complement of between forty-four and sixty.

Service history

First and second patrols
No ships were sunk during the first patrol which lasted from 26 October to 9 December 1941. U-402 followed the Norwegian coast from Kiel before heading west towards the Atlantic. The submarine sailed into St. Nazaire in France, after 45 uneventful days.

U-402 returned to St. Nazaire on 11 February 1942.

Third and fourth patrols
The U-boat had been unsuccessfully attacked by a US Navy PBY Catalina in mid-Atlantic on 29 April 1942.

The boat returned to the US eastern seaboard for her fourth patrol, but success eluded her. She returned to France, having been depth charged by patrol bombers off Cape Hatteras in mid-July and suffering a battery explosion. U-402 limped back to France, but this time to La Pallice, on 5 August 1942.

Fifth and sixth patrols
It was a different story on her fifth patrol; the boat attacked over 20,000 GRT of shipping, including the torpedoing of five ships from convoy SC 107 which involved the sinking of the British 4,945 GRT  on 2 November 1942 and a sister, Empire Sunrise, a few hours earlier.

She also had plenty of success when she attacked seven ships from convoy SC 118 on her sixth patrol. including the USS Henry R. Mallory.

Seventh and eighth patrols
Her seventh outing saw her sinking two ships from convoy SC 129. Retribution was swift; one of the escorts,  depth charged the boat causing severe damage, which included a tear 3 metres long in a ballast tank, which forced it to return to La Pallice on 26 May.

Her eighth and final patrol was marked with a paucity of targets and an ever-increasing frequency of air attacks; one of which involved a Wellington of 612 Squadron, RAF on 8 September. U-402 was not hit. The aircraft was damaged and reached RAF Portreath on one engine.

Loss
U-402 had departed La Pallice on 4 September 1943. On the 13 October she was sunk by a Mark 24 FIDO Torpedo dropped by Grumman TBF Avenger aircraft from the escort carrier .

Wolfpacks
U-402 took part in twelve wolfpacks, namely:
 Störtebecker (17 – 19 November 1941) 
 Benecke (19 – 25 November 1941) 
 Letzte Ritter (25 November – 4 December 1941) 
 Panther (10 – 20 October 1942) 
 Veilchen (20 October – 5 November 1942) 
 Landsknecht (19 – 28 January 1943) 
 Pfeil (1 – 8 February 1943) 
 Amsel 1 (3 – 6 May 1943) 
 Elbe (7 – 10 May 1943) 
 Elbe 2 (10 – 12 May 1943) 
 Leuthen (15 – 24 September 1943) 
 Rossbach (24 September – 6 October 1943)

Summary of raiding history

References

Notes

Citations

Bibliography

External links

German Type VIIC submarines
World War II submarines of Germany
1940 ships
U-boats commissioned in 1941
U-boats sunk in 1943
U-boats sunk by US aircraft
Ships lost with all hands
World War II shipwrecks in the Atlantic Ocean
Ships built in Danzig
Maritime incidents in October 1943